Anglo-American Publishing was a Canadian comic book publisher during the World War II era. While they published a number of Canadian creations, they also printed Canadian reworkings of scripts bought from American publisher Fawcett Comics.

History
American comic books were barred from crossing the border into Canada when the War Exchange Conservation Act passed in December 1940. In order to fill in the void and supply Canadian kids' appetite for comic books, Anglo American and Maple Leaf Publishing started publishing comics in March 1941.

Anglo-American's first title that March was Robin Hood and Company, a tabloid-sized publication which reprinted comic strips, chief amongst them Robin Hood and Company by Toronto Telegram'''s Ted McCall, which had run in Canadian newspapers since 1935.

Amongst Anglo-American's characters were Freelance, Commander Steel, Purple Rider, Red Rover, Kip Keene, Terry Kane and Dr Destine.

See also

 Canadian comics
 Golden Age of Comic Books
 Hillborough Studios
 Bell Features

References

Works cited

 Bell, John. Invaders from the North. Dundurn Press, 2007. 
 Beaty, Bart. "Comic Books and Graphic Novels". Encyclopedia of Literature in Canada'' (editor: New, William H.). University of Toronto Press, 2002. Pages 221–223. 

Comic book publishing companies of Canada
Golden Age of Comic Books
Publishing companies established in 1941